Carlos Bolívar Melo (born September 22, 1982) is a Panamanian former professional boxer who competed from 2001 to 2017 and challenged for the WBC light flyweight title in 2008.

External links
 

1982 births
Living people
Sportspeople from Panama City
Light-flyweight boxers
Panamanian male boxers